The SECR B1 class was a class of 4-4-0 steam tender locomotive for express passenger service on the South Eastern and Chatham Railway.  These engines were originally designed by James Stirling for the South Eastern Railway (SER) in 1898 and designated B class.  The SER was merged into the SECR in 1899 and, between 1910 and 1927 the B class engines were rebuilt with new boilers by Harry Wainwright to become B1 class.

Numbering
Twenty B Class engines were built by Neilson, Reid and Company and numbered 440-459.  A further 9 were built at the South Eastern Railway's Ashford railway works and given a jumble of numbers: 217, 13, 21, 101, 34, 17, 132, 186, 189.  They kept these numbers under the SECR.  When the Southern Railway took over in 1923 they initially gave the numbers an "A" prefix and later added 1000 to them.  For example, 440 became A440 and then 1440 and 13 became A13 and then 1013.  A few passed into British Railways ownership in 1948 and had 30000 added to their numbers but it is believed that only 31446 actually carried its number. All had been withdrawn and scrapped by the end of 1951. None remain today.

Accidents and incidents
On 19 May 1938, locomotive No. 1454 was derailed at  station, London, causing delays for several hours.

References

Bibliography
 

Locomotive history of the South Eastern Railway, D.L.Bradley,  Railway correspondence & travel society (RCTS)

External links

 Wainwright B1 Southern E-Group
 Class B1 Details RailUK

B1
4-4-0 locomotives
Railway locomotives introduced in 1898
Scrapped locomotives
Standard gauge steam locomotives of Great Britain